Eastern Slovak dialects, are dialects of the Slovak language spoken natively in the historical regions of Spiš, Šariš, Zemplín and Abov, in the east of Slovakia. In contrast to other dialects of Slovak, Eastern dialects are less intelligible with Czech and more with Polish and Rusyn.

Features of the dialects vary greatly from region to region, but features that are common throughout all dialects include the lack of long vowels, stress on the penultimate syllable, as in Polish and Rusyn, as opposed to the first syllable stress normal in standard Slovak, and variation in noun declension endings. Eastern Slovak dialects also share many features of Western Slovak dialects that are absent from Central dialects and standard Slovak, supporting the idea that Central Slovakia was inhabited more recently than the east and west of the country.

Attempts to create an East Slovak literary standard have been varied and unsuccessful.

History

The standard Slovak language, as codified by Ľudovít Štúr in the 1840s, was based largely on Central Slovak dialects spoken at the time. Eastern dialects are considerably different from Central and Western dialects in their phonology, morphology and vocabulary, set apart by a stronger connection to Polish and Rusyn. At the beginning of the 20th century, there was an unsuccessful attempt to standardise an East Slovak language.

Diaspora from the region has contributed to a scattered literary presence of Eastern Slovak dialects. Today,  is still in business and writes in standard Slovak.

Division

Eastern Slovak dialects can be divided into four subgroups:

 Spiš dialects, to the east of the town of Poprad, which border with Rusyn and the Polish Goral dialects.
 Šariš dialects, spoken around the city of Prešov, and sharing many features in common with Zemplín and Rusyn.
 Abov dialects, including the Košice dialect, spoken in south-western eastern Slovakia and sharing several phonological features with Hungarian and Zemplín.
 Zemplín dialects, spoken in the far south and central eastern Slovakia, which form the transition between Slovak, Šariš and Rusyn.

Linguistic features

Linguistic features common to East Slovak dialects include:

 Word stress falls on the penultimate syllable, not the first.
 Vowel length is not distinguished - all vowels are short.
 Consonants n, l, s and z always realised as softened ň, ľ, š and ž before i, and sometimes also before e, often assimilating diphthongs ( > ,  > ,  > ,  > ). Until the 14th century, an even wider array of soft (palatalised) consonants existed in Slovak, and this feature can still be heard in some Zemplín dialects.
 Consonants ť and ď, including t and d when softened, realised as c and dz ( > ), meaning the infinitive ending for verbs changes from -ť to -c. The consonants ť and ď can only be found in onomatopoeia ( = the cooing of a pigeon), and loanwords including personal names ( > ) in Eastern dialects.
 Syllabic l and r are always complemented by a vowel in Eastern dialects. The tone and position of the vowel greatly varies from region to region. The lack of syllabic consonants is also shared by other dialects of northern Slovakia and southern Poland and the Lach dialects of Czech.
 Especially in Abov dialects, ch is always realised as h ( > ).
 Noun declension is different from in standard Slovak. The genitive and locative plurals are always -och, regardless of gender, and the dative plural is always -om. ( > ,  > ,  > ,  > ).  ("in Košice") becomes , except in the Košice dialect, which treats the city's name as a singular noun and uses .
 The letter ä is realised as e ( > ). Accusative personal pronouns ending in -a also end in -e;  become .

Example text

Eastern Slovak (Šariš dialect)

Standard Slovak

References

Slovak language
Slovak dialects
Vulnerable languages